AND 1 Streetball is a streetball video game for PlayStation 2 and Xbox, developed by Black Ops Entertainment and published by Ubisoft. The game was released on June 6, 2006, in conjunction with the AND1 Mixtape Tour. A scaled-down, mobile version of the game, developed by Gameloft, called "And1 Street Basketball" was also released. 

While not the first game to feature AND 1 players, AND 1 Streetball is officially licensed by the company, and includes the 2005 AND1 roster as well as Duke Tango, AND1's MC for its annual Mix Tape Tours.

The game features a story mode mirroring the "And1 Streetball" series on ESPN, where players are able to create their own basketball player and enter him in the AND1 Mix Tape Tour in order to get a contract with the AND1 team. Along the way, players are able to create their own stylized trick moves and pull them off with a two-analog stick system called "I BALL."

The PlayStation 2 version supports multiplayer via multitap and GameSpy, while the Xbox version includes Xbox Live support.

Reception

The PlayStation 2 version received "mixed" reviews, while the Xbox version received "generally unfavorable reviews" according to video game review aggregator Metacritic.

References

External links
Official site

Interview with Black Ops Entertainment VP Jose Villeta on the game

2006 video games
AND1
Mobile games
PlayStation 2 games
Xbox games
Multiplayer and single-player video games
Video games scored by Tommy Tallarico
Video games developed in the United States
Gameloft games
Black Ops Entertainment games
Ubisoft games